Joseph Richard Kopacz (born September 16, 1950) is an American prelate of the Roman Catholic Church, serving as bishop of the Diocese of Jackson in Mississippi since 2014.

Early life and education
Joseph Kopacz was born in Dunmore, Pennsylvania. He is the son of Stanley and Carmella Calomino Kopacz. He is the second of three children with a brother, Robert, and a sister, Mary Ellen Negri. Joseph Kopacz is a graduate of Dunmore Central Catholic High School. He obtained a Bachelor of History degree from the University of Scranton. He then entered the Seminary of Christ the King in Buffalo, New York, where he obtained a Master of Theology degree.  

Kopacz obtained a Masters in Latin from Fordham University. He obtained a Master in Counselling and Psychology and a doctorate in human development from Marywood University in Scranton.

Priesthood
Kopacz was ordained a priest for the Diocese of Scranton on May 7, 1977.  After his ordination, he was parish priest of Our Lady Queen of Peace Parish in Brodheadsville, Pennsylvania (1977–1989). He was professor at the Saint Pius X Seminary in Dalton (1980–1990) and pastor of the parish of Saint Michael, Saint James and Saint Stanislaus in Jessup, Pennsylvania (1989–1995).

Kopacz was transferred to the Nativity of Our Lord Parish in Scranton (1995–1998). After this he was appointed director of education at the Seminary Saint Pius X (1998–2002), and pastor of the Sacred Hearts of Jesus and Mary Parish in Scranton (2002–2006).

Kopacz served as vicar general and vicar for clergy (February 2005 – August 2009). From 2006 to 2014 he was the pastor of Most Holy Trinity Parish in Mount Pocono, Pennsylvania. In addition, he was a member of the Diocesan Council for Finance and coordinator of Hispanic apostolate for Monroe County.

Episcopacy
On December 12, 2013 Pope Francis appointed Kopacz as the eleventh bishop of the Diocese of Jackson.  He was consecrated by Archbishop Thomas Rodi on February 6, 2014.  Emeritus Bishop Joseph Latino and Bishop Joseph Bambera were the principal co-consecrators.

See also

 Catholic Church hierarchy
 Catholic Church in the United States
 Historical list of the Catholic bishops of the United States
 List of Catholic bishops of the United States
 Lists of patriarchs, archbishops, and bishops

References

External links
Roman Catholic Diocese of Jackson Official Site

Episcopal succession

 

1950 births
Living people
21st-century Roman Catholic bishops in the United States
Roman Catholic bishops of Jackson
American people of Polish descent
Fordham University alumni
Marywood University alumni
People from Dunmore, Pennsylvania
University of Scranton alumni
Catholics from Pennsylvania
Bishops appointed by Pope Francis